Pilla Zamindar is a 2011 Indian Telugu-language coming-of-age comedy drama film written and directed by G. Ashok. The film stars Nani, Haripriya, and Bindu Madhavi while Srinivas Avasarala, Dhanraj, Thagubothu Ramesh, Rao Ramesh and Nagineedu play supporting roles. Inspired by the South Korean film A Millionaire's First Love (2006), and The Ultimate Gift (2006), the plot follows Praveen "PJ" Jayaramaraju (Nani), an arrogant youngster who is set to inherit his grandfather's wealth but must fulfil certain conditions in order to do so. The film has soundtrack composed by Selvaganesh. Pilla Zamindar was released on 14 October 2011.

Plot 
Praveen "PJ" Jayaramaraju, the grandson of a wealthy zamindar Rudra Ramaraju, is a spoiled arrogant youngster. He attends lavish parties and spends money recklessly. PJ also breakups with Sindhu when she exposes his cheating in an exam. On PJ's 18th birthday, his dying grandfather's will with several conditions is presented to him. It states that PJ would inherit the entire wealth subject to the following conditions:

 He should complete his graduation as a common man without any luxuries in Shrimati Mangamma Government Degree College.
 He must also complete it within three years.
 He needs to stay in Rajanna hostel in Siripuram and manage living with a very little money (similar to other students who study on scholarship).

In addition to this, another clause would be told three months after joining the college. 

PJ goes to the village and meets Rajanna, the hostel warden. He joins the college but finds it hard to adjust to the surroundings. He becomes good friends with Kanna Babu, Jaatheeyam, Maqbool, and others. Sindhu also comes to study in the same college which is in her hometown. While PJ struggles to adapt to simple village life, he passes the supplementary exams with the help of Sindhu who scribes for him because his hands are wounded.

Three months after he joins the college, another condition is revealed that he needs to be elected as the student union president of the college and he must not have a fight with anyone during his time there. PJ begins to adapt to the conditions and changes his lavish lifestyle. Slowly, he realises the value of life and human beings.

In the second year of his degree, PJ tries to get elected as a president by bribing people with alcohol but it backfires as he loses the respect and trust of all his friends and Rajanna. When disheartened PJ tries to abandon the college, Rajanna reveals the true purpose and reason behind his grandfather's conditions. PJ's father had previously studied in the same college where met his future wife, PJ's mother. Rajanna and PJ's father were friends and he is like an uncle to PJ. PJ's father married against the wishes of Ramaraju and as a result, he was deprived of his inheritance. Ramaraju later realises his mistake but his son and daughter-in-law die in an accident, and PJ grows to be the arrogant rich person he is. PJ now comes to the realisation that people are above money. He falls in love with Sindhu who reciprocates his feelings. 

In the final year, PJ forms a student club and helps the villagers in various aspects like bringing the teachers back to the school and fixing the roads and potholes. Ammiraju, PJ's opponent in the student election, tries to win playing the caste card but fails to do so. PJ provides logical arguments for the betterment of the college and gets elected, satisfying the last of his grandfather's wishes. 

PJ not only succeeds in fulfilling the conditions laid down by his grandfather but also transforms into a good person. On the day of his graduation, he risks his entire property to save Kanna Babu's life. As PJ was ready to abandon his property for saving a friend in need, he earns back his wealth and the love of all.

Cast

Production 
Nani and Srinivas Avasarala are once again seen together in this film after Ashta Chemma. G. Ashok opted most of the same crew who previously worked with him in Aakasa Ramanna for this film. They include Praveen Poodi handling the editing, Sai Sriram handling the camera, Chandrashekar writing the dialogues and finally Manivasan doing the art. Popular Kannada actress Haripriya was cast for the role of Sindhu, love interest of the main lead. Bindu Madhavi was cast for the role of Amrutha and Srinivas Avasarala was cast for the role of Nani's friend. Being a comedy film, it features most of the Telugu comedians like M. S. Narayana, Dhanraj, Ramesh, Raghu, Venu and Vennela Kishore. Meghna Naidu did a special song in the movie. M. S. Narayana was cast in a role of Telugu lecturer, his previous real life job before becoming an actor. Chandrashekar Gundimeda assisted Ashok with the dialogues. Shooting of the film began in October 2010 and was initially planned to release in April 2011. but the film got delayed due to 2011 Telugu film industry strike. The movie was completed in August 2011 and the film was released in October 2011.  Shooting was predominantly done in Hyderabad and Guntur.

Release and reception 
The film was released worldwide on 14 October 2011. Jeevi of Idlebrain.com rated the film 3/5 and praised Nani for his acting in the movie. Reviewer from CNN-IBN gave a positive review stating that the movie is above average and Nani's performance impressive. The film was successful at the box-office.

Soundtrack 

Audio release of the film was held on 19 September 2011 in Prasads Lab, Hyderabad. The audio was released and distributed by Aditya Music. The music of this film was composed by Selvaganesh. The audio was well received. Telugu lyricist Krishna Chaitanya penned 5 songs in the film while Sri Mani wrote the remaining one song.

References

External links

2011 films
2010s Telugu-language films
Films scored by V. Selvaganesh
Indian buddy comedy-drama films
Films about friendship
Indian remakes of South Korean films
Indian coming-of-age comedy-drama films
2010s coming-of-age comedy-drama films
Films set in Andhra Pradesh
Films set in Hyderabad, India
Films shot in Andhra Pradesh
Films shot in Hyderabad, India